Fulrada carpasella is a species of snout moth in the genus Fulrada. It was described by Schaus in 1923. It is found on the Galapagos Islands.

References

Moths described in 1923
Phycitinae